Palali is a village and former non-salute Rajput princely state on Saurashtra peninsula in Gujarat state, western India.

History 
Palali was a petty princely state in Jhalawar prant, comprising the town and another village, under Jhala Rajput Chieftains.

It had a combined population of 329 in 1901, yielding a state revenue of 650 Rupees (nearly all from land; 1903-4) and paying 403 Rupees tribute to the British and to Junagadh State.

During the British Raj, it was under the colonial Eastern Kathiawar Agency.

References

External links and sources 
History
 Imperial Gazetteer on DSAL.UChicago - Kathiawar

Villages in Surendranagar district